The Cactuseraie d'Escaïre-Figue (1 hectare) is a botanical garden specializing in cactus. It is located in Montolieu, Aude, Languedoc-Roussillon, France, and opens daily except Mondays.

The garden was created circa 2000, and now contains some 2,000 specimens representing about 900 varieties of cactus and succulents, in both natural and formal plantings, as well as a large greenhouse. Many of the plants have leaves.

See also 
 List of botanical gardens in France

References 
 Cactuseraie d'Escaïre-Figue
 Culture.fr entry (French)
 Je Decouvre La France entry (French)
 audetourisme.com(French)

Gardens in Aude
Botanical gardens in France